Bolpur is a city and a municipality in Birbhum district in the state of West Bengal, India. It is the headquarters of the Bolpur subdivision. Bolpur municipal area includes Santiniketan, Sriniketan and Prantik. The city is known as a Cultural and Educational hub of West Bengal. The city is under the Jurisdiction of Bolpur and Santiniketan Police station. Bolpur is the largest and most populous city in Birbhum district and 28th most populous city in West Bengal. Located on the banks of Ajay River and Kopai (Sal) River, Bolpur has been a major Human settlement. It is 150 km north of Kolkata and is famous for Visva Bharati, the University set up by the Nobel laureate poet Rabindranath Tagore.

Etymology
There is a mythical story that says that Supur was the capital of Raja Surath. He lost his kingdom when he had gone out for conquests, but regained the same with the blessings of goddess Bhavani. In his worship of gratitude, Raja Surath organised the sacrificial slaughtering of one lakh goats. As a result, the name of place where the sacrificial offerings were made became ‘Bolipur’ – with time it became Bolpur.

History

About 150 years ago, Bolpur was a small village under Supur Porgana. Kalikapur a known place of Bolpur was the origin of the typical village in past. There were no rail lines, no developed roads. Paddy land were seen around the village. "Lalmati" (red soil) was found everywhere. Many villages named Sian, Dihipara, Khoskadampur, Paruldanga, Goalpara, Ballavpur, Bandhgara, Surul, Supur, Raipur were the boundary line around Bolpur.

East India company established the first railway line in 1859, when the Sahebganj loopline was extended beyond the river Ajay. Bolpur railway station was established in 1860. Along with this, court, police station, sub registry office, etc., were established in old Bolpur. Then people started residing here. Christian missionaries came; they founded a church that was known as Mission compound. Paddy storage house, stationary shops, grocery shops, garment shops etc. were on the east side near Bolpur railway station. About 19 husking machines were here at that time.

Maharshi Debendranath Tagore established a centre of religious mediation in Bolpur. Rabindranath Tagore established Visva Bharati Viswavidyalaya in 1921. These were the main reasons for the huge extension, development and popularity of Bolpur.

Provincial names proved the upcoming gradual development of Bolpur. Kachharipatti is just beside court house, Trishulapatti is the commercial paddy trading centre. Kalibaroarytala was the service place for Bolpur set up by some initiative people. Netaji made a conference. Here Harisava stood against "Bramhopasana". Every week these two conferences were held in Bolpur. Bijaykrishna Ghoswami, Shivnath Shastri, Shasibhusan Basu and others gave religious advice. Beside this, prayer committee was set up.

Geography

Location

Note: The map alongside presents some of the notable locations in the area. All places marked in the map are linked in the larger full screen map.

In the map of Bolpur-Sriniketan CD block on page 718 of District Census Handbook Birbhum (Part A), while the area covered by Shantiniketan is shown as a part of Bolpur, Sriniketan is shown as a part of Surul, a census town.

Police station
Bolpur police station has jurisdiction over Bolpur Sriniketan community development block.

Climate
The climate of Shantiniketan is moderately warm, with summer temperatures at around 35-42 °C (maximum) and winter at 6-15 °C (minimum). Summer is felt for three months, March, April and May. December, January and February are the winter months. June, July, August and September see heavy rainfall, these four months are known as monsoon (rainy season) with dry humid. Shantiniketan saw its highest temperature rising 47.0 °C, on 10 June 1966. The lowest temperature ever recorded is 5.0 °C, on 15 January 2003 (see the weather box below). The annual average temperature is 26.2 °C. About 1480mm of rain falls per year, with 76 days seeing the rain.
The area is classified as an "Aw" (tropical savanna climate) under the Köppen Climate Classification.

Demography

As per the 2011 Census of India, Bolpur had a total population of 80,210, of which 40,468 (50%) were males and 39,742 (50%) were females. Population in the age range of 0–6 years was 6,852. The total number of literates in Bolpur was 63,656 (86.77% of the population 7 years and over).

Religion
According to Census of India 2011, Hinduism is the predominant religion in Bolpur, followed by 89.77% of the population. It is followed by Islam with 9.68% adherents. Other religions like Christianity, Jainism, Sikhism and Buddhism are followed by less than 1% of the population.

Civic administration
Bolpur municipality is divided into 22 wards. Until 2010, the Indian National Congress was in power in it. In the 2010 municipal elections, the municipality faced a hung verdict. Later, the Trinamool Congress with nine councillors, formed the board by taking the support of eight Congress councillors. This board officially ended its term on 2020, but due to COVID-19 pandemic, municipal election is on hold for this municipality. An Interim Administrative board is on charge of Bolpur municipality, Parna Ghosh is the current Chairperson of the municipal board.

Transport

Railways
Bolpur Shantiniketan railway station (BHP) is the major railway station under Howrah Division of Eastern Railway (ER). The station is well connected to the major cities, specially state capital Kolkata. Apart from West Bengal, the station connected to cities of other states like Guwahati, Dibrugarh, Agartala, Bhubaneswar, Visakhapatnam, Bangalore, Hyderabad and Mumbai.

Another railway station in the city is Prantik railway station (PNE) which is the next station of Bolpur Shantiniketan. Some local passenger and express trains give a stop in this station.

Roadways
Bolpur is connected to all important cities by roadways. National Highway 114 (old numbering NH 2B) pass through Bolpur. The highway runs from NH 14 (old numbering NH 60) at Mallarpur to NH 19 (old numbering NH 2) at Burdwan. This highway connects Bolpur with Burdwan (60 km) and Kolkata (160 km). SH 14 or Morgram - Panagarh highway passes through 15 km away from Bolpur at Illambazar, and junction with NH 19 at Panagarh (40 km). This route connects Bolpur with Durgapur (54 km), Asansol (97 km), Maithon (120 km) and Dhanbad (160 km). Bolpur-Suri road connects Bolpur with district headquarter Suri (35 km) and the road cross NH 14 at Suri. After crossing, the road goes towards Massanjore (70 km), Dumka (98 km), Deoghar (165 km). Distance from Bolpur to Berhampore via Nanoor is 100 km, and Katwa via Nutanhat is 54 km.

Bolpur is connected through WBTC, SBSTC and private bus services. Private cab services are also available.

Airways
Bolpur has no airport of its own. The nearest airport from Bolpur is Kazi Nazrul Islam Airport located 70 km away in Andal, Durgapur. The nearest international airport is Netaji Subhash Chandra Bose International Airport (CCU) located 160 km away in Dum Dum (Kolkata).

Education

Universities and Colleges

Universities
 Visva-Bharati University
 Seacom Skills University
 Biswa Bangla Biswabidyalay (Bolpur University)

General Colleges
 Bolpur College
 Purni Devi Chaudhuri Girls' College (PDCGC)

Medical Colleges
 Santiniketan Medical College

Engineering / Management / Polytechnic
 Bengal Institute of Technology & Management (B.I.T.M Santiniketan)
 Santiniketan Institute of Polytechnic (S.I.P Bolpur)

Law Colleges
 Bengal Law College

Nursing Colleges
 Santiniketan Sebaniketan Nursing Institute

Schools

Visva Bharati affiliated Schools
 Patha Bhavana
 Siksha Satra

Residential Schools
 Ekalavya Model Residential School (EMRS)

Private Schools
 Techno India Group Public School (TIGPS)
 St. Teresa's Secondary School
 Ryan International School
 Nava Nalanda High School
 North Point Senior Secondary Boarding School

Central Government Schools
 Kendriya Vidyalaya, Bolpur

State Government High Schools
 Bolpur High School
 Bolpur Girls' High School
 Bandhgora Kalikrishna Vidyapith
 Srinanda High School
 Bolpur NNB High School
 Bolpur Vivekananda Vidyapith
 Shailabala Girls' High School
 Bolpur Tarashankar Vidyapith

Healthcare
Bolpur Subdivisional Hospital has 125 beds. Bolpur Block Primary Health Centre at Bolpur, serving Bolpur Sriniketan community development block, has 60 beds.

Wildlife sanctuary
• Ballabhpur Wildlife Sanctuary & Deer Park (Santiniketan)

Notable people

References

External links
 Around Bolpur The Telegraph, 19 December 2004
  From Bolpur to Santiniketan
  Santiniketan travel guide
 

Cities and towns in Birbhum district
Cities in West Bengal